Bob Holtzman (born 1971) is a television bureau-reporter for ESPN located in the city of Cincinnati, Ohio. He contributes to stories on ESPN shows such as SportsCenter, Outside the Lines, Sunday NFL Countdown, and Baseball Tonight.

Before joining ESPN in November 2000, he was a reporter at WCPO in Cincinnati, Ohio from 1996 to 2000. Prior to that, he served in a similar role at KCRA in Sacramento, California and KRQE in Albuquerque, New Mexico.

Holtzman is a 1993 graduate of the University of Kansas with a degrees in journalism and psychology. He is also a certified meteorologist.

Holtzman was born in Tulsa, Oklahoma, but grew up in San Diego, California. He currently resides near Florence, Kentucky.

References

External links
Bob Holtzman ESPN Bio

Living people
American sports journalists
Year of birth uncertain
1972 births